Oklaunion is an unincorporated community in Wilbarger County, Texas, United States. According to the Handbook of Texas, the community had an estimated population of 138 in 2000.

Geography
Oklaunion is located at  (34.1295324, -99.1428544). It is situated at the junction of U.S. Highways 283, 70, and 183 in northeastern Wilbarger County, approximately nine miles east of Vernon. The nearest large city is Wichita Falls, located 42 miles east of Oklaunion.

Climate
The climate in this area is characterized by hot, humid summers and generally mild to cool winters.  According to the Köppen Climate Classification system, Oklaunion has a humid subtropical climate, abbreviated "Cfa" on climate maps.

History
Originally known as Mayflower, the community was renamed Oklaunion around 1888 by Joseph S. "Buckskin" Works. The reason behind the name change was an attempt to attract the Frisco line to the community so that it would connect with the Fort Worth and Denver City Railway. Nearby Vernon was chosen as the site for the linkage, however, but Oklaunion prospered as a stop on the Fort Worth and Denver City line. A post office was established in 1889 and a school opened during the mid-1890s.

The community voted to incorporate on June 6, 1928. In 1930, the town had a population of 254. That figure fell to 223 in 1940 and 129 by 1950. Sometime after, the town dissolved its incorporation. The population had fallen to fewer than 140 in 1990 and remained at that level by 2000.

Although Oklaunion is unincorporated, it has a post office with the zip code of 76373.

Demographics

2020 census

As of the 2020 United States census, there were 88 people, 43 households, and 43 families residing in the CDP.

Power supply facilities
Near Oklaunion, there is a coal-fired power station, named Oklaunion Power Plant. It has a capacity of 650 megawatts.

Since 1984 there has been a back-to-back HVDC station at Oklaunion which was built by General Electric. It works with a voltage of 345 kV and has a transfer rate of 220 megawatts.
The plant was scheduled to be shut down in September 2020.  The reason was high cost to keep the emissions at levels acceptable.  The plant was bid on and won by Frontier Energy.  They will convert the plant to natural gas, a cleaner burning fossil fuel.

Education
Public education in the community of Oklaunion is provided by the Vernon Independent School District. The Oklaunion Independent School District consolidated with Vernon in 1967.

References

External links

Unincorporated communities in Texas
Unincorporated communities in Wilbarger County, Texas
Energy in Texas
Former cities in Texas